Stănița is a commune in Neamț County, Western Moldavia, Romania. It has 2,281 people, and is composed of seven villages: Chicerea, Ghidion, Poienile Oancei, Stănița, Todireni, Veja and Vlădnicele. In turn, Todireni village is made up of three hamlets: Fundu Poienii, Todireni and Cichirdic.

References

Communes in Neamț County
Localities in Western Moldavia